was an Edo period Japanese priest of the Jōdo-shū sect of Buddhism; devotee of the tea ceremony; connoisseur of camellias; and dilettante poet. The name Anrakuan takes from the name of the tea house that he built and lived at after he retired at the age of seventy. He is famous as the author of the Seisuishō (醒睡笑, Laughs to Wake You Up), which is a collection of humorous anecdotes. The Seisuishō is considered a major progenitor of the popular Edo-period literary genre called hanashibon (咄本), books of humorous stories.

The Seisuishō, which Anrakuan Sakuden compiled in 1623 through the urging of Itakura Shigemune (1588–1656), the magistrate of Kyoto, consists of eight chapters, divided into volumes.

References

Japanese writers
1554 births
1642 deaths
Jōdo-shū Buddhist priests
Edo period Buddhist clergy